Babu Singh is an Indian politician from the Bharatiya Janata Party and a three-term member of the Rajasthan Legislative Assembly representing the Shergarh Vidhan Sabha constituency of Rajasthan.

In the 2018 election, Babu Singh lost to Indian National Congress candidate Meena Kanwar.

References 

Living people
1972 births
People from Jodhpur
Bharatiya Janata Party politicians from Rajasthan
Rajasthan MLAs 2013–2018